Compsopogonales is an order of mostly freshwater red algae.

References

Further reading

John A. West, Giuseppe C. Zuccarello, Joseph L. Scott, Kathryn A. West, and Susan Loiseaux de Goer (2007) Pulvinus veneticus gen. et sp. nov. (Compsopogonales, Rhodophyta) from Vanuatu. Phycologia: May 2007, Vol. 46, No. 3, pp. 237-246.

Red algae orders
Compsopogonophyceae